Jason David Moss (born April 19, 1969) is an American musician, known for his work as the lead guitarist for the ska-swing band the Cherry Poppin' Daddies, of which he was a member from 1992 to 2010.

Biography

Early life
Born in Lawrence, Kansas, Moss grew up in Oregon following his family's relocation to Eugene in 1976. Influenced by hard rock and guitarists such as Jimmy Page and Ace Frehley, Moss taught himself guitar at age 14, and spent most of his early music career playing in various Eugene cover bands and a group called The Impostors. After his graduation from South Eugene High School in 1986, he left to study journalism at Western Washington University.

Career
Following the departure of Cherry Poppin' Daddies guitarist John Fohl in 1992, the band placed an open ad seeking a replacement member. Already a fan of the regionally popular group, Moss responded and, after being hired on the spot by Daddies frontman Steve Perry, dropped out of school to tour with the group full-time. Moss played lead guitar on all of the Daddies' recordings from 1994's Rapid City Muscle Car to 2009's Skaboy JFK before leaving the band in March 2010 to resume his education. He has since performed with the band on few occasions, substituting for then-guitarist William Seiji Marsh for two concerts in Washington in February 2012, and playing alongside Marsh for Zoot Suit Riot, a live music and dance show created by the Eugene Ballet Company featuring the music of the Daddies, in April 2014.

Throughout his tenure with the Daddies, Moss alternated between a Gibson Les Paul, an Epiphone Broadway hollowbody and a Hamer Artist Mahogany, and most recently used Vox amplifiers.

Outside of the Daddies, Moss also played and recorded with the Eugene-based glam punk band White Hot Odyssey alongside Steve Perry and the hip hop–jazz group Runaway Slave. In 2011, he relocated to the Bay Area, where he currently works as a guitar instructor and plays with the Los Altos classic and modern rock cover band The Megatones.

Discography

Cherry Poppin' Daddies
See: Cherry Poppin' Daddies discography for complete list of recordings
Rapid City Muscle Car (1994) – lead guitar
Kids on the Street (1996) – lead guitar
Zoot Suit Riot (1997) – lead guitar (tracks 1, 3–7, 9, 12)
Soul Caddy (2000) – guitar
Susquehanna (2008) – guitar
Skaboy JFK (2009) – guitar

White Hot Odyssey
White Hot Odyssey (2004) – guitar

References

1969 births
Living people
20th-century American male musicians
20th-century American guitarists
American rock guitarists
American ska guitarists
American male guitarists
Lead guitarists
Guitarists from Oregon
Guitarists from Kansas
Musicians from Lawrence, Kansas
Cherry Poppin' Daddies members
Western Washington University alumni
South Eugene High School alumni